A Lady's Morals is a 1930 American pre-Code film offering a highly fictionalized account of opera singer Jenny Lind. The movie features Grace Moore as Lind, Reginald Denny as a lover, and Wallace Beery as P. T. Barnum. The film contains some opera arias by Moore and was directed by Sidney Franklin.

Wallace Beery would play Barnum again four years later in The Mighty Barnum (1934), with Virginia Bruce as Jenny Lind.

Cast

Grace Moore as Jenny Lind
Reginald Denny as Paul Brandt
Wallace Beery as P. T. Barnum
Jobyna Howland as Josephine
Gus Shy as Olaf
Gilbert Emery as Broughm
George F. Marion as Innkeeper
Paul Porcasi as Innkeeper

Soundtrack
"It Is Destiny"
Lyrics by Clifford Grey
Music by Oscar Straus
Copyright 1930 by Harms Inc.
Played by Reginald Denny on piano and sung by Grace Moore
Reprised by Grace Moore singing and on piano
"Rataplan"
from "La fille du régiment"
Music by Gaetano Donizetti
Played at an opera house with Grace Moore singing as Marie
"Student's Song"
Music by Oscar Straus
Lyrics by Clifford Grey
Sung by students escorting Grace Moore home
"Oh Why"
Lyrics by Arthur Freed
Music by Herbert Stothart and Harry M. Woods
Copyright 1930 Harms Inc.
Played by Grace Moore singing and on piano
"Casta Diva"
from "Norma"
Music by Vincenzo Bellini
Played at an opera house and sung by Grace Moore as Norma
"Swedish Pastorale"
Written by Howard Johnson and Herbert Stothart
Sung by a group in Sweden
"Lovely Hour"
Words and Music by Carrie Jacobs Bond
Copyright 1929 by Carrie Jacobs-Bond & Son
Sung first by Grace Moore off-screen
Reprised by her at P.T.Barnum's show in New York City
"I Hear Your Voice"
Music by Oscar Straus
Lyrics by Clifford Grey

Remake

The film was remade as the 1932 American French-language film titled Jenny Lind.

External links 
 
 
 A Lady's Morals plot by Sanderson Beck (1999)

1930 films
1930s biographical films
1930s historical films
American historical films
American biographical films
American black-and-white films
Metro-Goldwyn-Mayer films
Films directed by Sidney Franklin
Films produced by Irving Thalberg
Biographical films about singers
Films set in the 19th century
Films scored by Oscar Straus
Cultural depictions of Jenny Lind
Cultural depictions of P. T. Barnum
1930s English-language films
1930s American films